The Arbeitsrat für Kunst (German: 'Workers council for art' or 'Art Soviet') was a union of architects, painters, sculptors and art writers, who were based in Berlin from 1918 to 1921. It developed as a response to the Workers and Soldiers councils and was dedicated to the goal of bringing the current developments and tendencies in architecture and art to a broader population.

The Arbeitsrat worked closely with the Novembergruppe and the Deutscher Werkbund. Some of the architects represented in the Arbeitsrat united in the Glass Chain, or joined the correspondence group, Der Ring. Many members were important founders of the Bauhaus. Individual members informed the most important German academy of art of the time, the Staatliche Akademie für Kunst und Kunstgewerbe Breslau, as well as the Bauhaus.

Aims 

Their demands were: the acknowledgment of all tasks of building as public and not private tasks, the abolition of all official privileges, the establishment of community centers as places to exchange art and ideas, the dissolution of the Academy of the arts and the Prussian national art commission, the release of architectural, plastics, painting and handicraft commissions from national patronage, the promotion of museums as education places, the removal of artistically worthless monuments and the formation of a state body to oversee and promote education in the arts.

The Arbeitsrat reacted to the unpalatable situation concerning orders for young architects, who were lost in the First world war.

Members 

The founding members were Bruno Taut, Walter Gropius acting from 1919, César Klein, and Adolf Behne as Chairman.

The signatories of the first manifesto were - besides Taut, Gropius, Klein and Behne:

Otto Bartning
Rudolf Belling
Arthur Degner
Lyonel Feininger
Otto Freundlich
Yefim Golïshev
August Griesbach
Hermann Hasler
Erwin Hahs
Erich Heckel
Paul Rudolf Henning
Karl Jakob Hirsch
Walter Kaesbach
Georg Kolbe
Gerhard Marcks
Ludwig Meidner
Moritz Melzer
Otto Mueller
Franz Mutzenbecher
Emil Nolde
Max Pechstein
Friedrich Perzynski
Heinrich Richter-Berlin
Richard Scheibe
Karl Schmidt-Rottluff
Fritz Stuckenberg
Georg Tappert
Max Taut
Arnold Topp
Wilhelm Reinhold Valentiner

Over 100 artists and architects from Germany and abroad, supported the group and were participants in its exhibitions. Some of these were:

Karl Paul Andrae
Walter Curt Behrendt
Max Berg
Paul Cassirer
Nicolay Diulgheroff
Hermann Finsterlin
Paul Gösch
Otto Gothe
Wenzel Hablik
Oswald Herzog
Bernhard Hoetger
Willy Jaeckel
Käthe Kollwitz
Carl Krayl
Mechtilde Lichnowsky
Hans
Wassili Luckhardt
Paul Mebes
Ludwig Meidner
Julius Meier-Graefe
Adolf Meyer
Michael Mejer
Erich Mendelsohn
Johannes Molzahn
Karl Ernst Osthaus
Hans Poelzig
Paul Schmitthenner
Herman Sörgel
Milly Steger
Heinrich Tessenow
Wilhelm Worringer

Actions 

The Arbeitsrat recruited the public to participate in its art and architectural exhibitions and publications. Its exhibitions were open for non-architects and also for non-members of the group to take part, with designs, models, sketches and sculptures.

Exhibitions 

 "Ausstellung für unbekannte Architekten",(Exhibition for unknown architects ) Berlin und Weimar, 1919
 "Neues Bauen" (New building), Berlin, 1920

Publications 

 Bruno Taut: Ein Architektur-Programm. (An architectural programme) Berlin 1918 
 Paul Rudolf Henning: Ton. Ein Aufruf von P. R. Henning. Zweite Flugschrift des Arbeitsrats für Kunst (Clay/tone/sound. A call by P.R. Henning. Second Pamphlet of the work advice for art  ). Berlin ca. 1918
 Arbeitsrat für Kunst (Hrsg.): Arbeitsrat für Kunst. Flugblatt (Arbeitsrat für Kunst. Leaflet). Envelope with woodcut by Max Pechstein, Berlin 1919
 Arbeitsrat für Kunst (Hrsg.): Ja! Stimmen des Arbeitsrates für Kunst in Berlin (Yes! Voices of the Art Society in Berlin). Berlin 1919
 Arbeitsrat für Kunst (Hrsg.): Ruf zum Bauen: zweite Buchpublikation des Arbeiterrats für Kunst (Call for building: Second book publication of the Arbeitsrats für Kunst). Berlin 1920
 Otto Bartning: Ein Unterrichtsplan für Architektur und bildende Künste (An instruction plan for architecture and the visual arts)

Notes

References
 Karl Ernst Osthaus: Reden und Schriften. Folkwang – Werkbund – Arbeitsrat. König, Köln 2002. 
 Regine Prange: Architekturphantasie ohne Architektur? Der Arbeitsrat für Kunst und seine Ausstellungen, in: Thorsten Scheer, Josef Paul Kleihues, Paul Kahlfeldt (Hrsg.): Bauen in Berlin: 1900–2000. Stadt der Architektur. Architektur der Stadt 1900–2000. Nicolai, Berlin 2000. 
 Manfred Schlösser: Arbeitsrat für Kunst: Berlin 1918–1921. Akademie der Künste, Berlin 1980.   
 Eberhard Steneberg: Arbeitsrat für Kunst. Berlin 1918–1921. Marzona, Düsseldorf 1987.

External links 
 Katrin Husmann: Der Arbeitsrat für Kunst
 Uwe M. Schneede: Die abgesonderte Welt. Hermann Finsterlin und die Gläserne Kette
 This page was translated from the German Wikipedia at:- :de:Arbeitsrat für Kunst.

Expressionist architecture
Architecture groups
Culture in Berlin
1910s in Berlin
1920s in Berlin
1918 establishments in Germany
1921 disestablishments in Germany